Government Hnahthial College is the only institute of higher education in Hnahthial, Hnahthial district of Mizoram, Northeast India. It was established in 1979 in Hnahthial. It became a government college under the Government of Mizoram in 1981. 
Under governmental organisation of Mizoram, it operates as a branch of the Mizoram College Teachers' Association.

History 
In the absence of higher education in Hnahthial, the college was started in 1979. Initially the college was established under the private management The College until 1981 was solely financed by the donations collected from the public. However, with the assistance of Government of Mizoram it was provincialized in 1981 as became fully fledged college under the Mizoram University. The College was given permission to open classes up to Pre-university level on 10 August 1981 by the Government of Mizoram and was upgraded to the Deficit-in-Aid status with effect from 1 July 1988. The North Eastern Hill University granted an affiliation for both Pre-University and degree courses respectively on 19 November 1982 and 6 March 1987. The College has been granted permanent affiliation in 2005 and has also been recognized by UGC on 17 November 2006 under 2(f) and 12 (B) of the UGC Act.

Location
Government Hnahthial College is located in the District Capital of Hnahthial District which is the southern region of Mizoram. The town is 157 km from Aizawl (via Sialsuk). Hnahthial town is connected by National highway no.54 and is seven hours drive from the capital. By taking state highway, it is only 5 hours drive from Aizawl via Sialsuk. The college is situated 1.3 km away from Hnahthial town where college bus is always available for faculty and students.

Departments
The college admitted around 130 students every year  The institution offered seven undergraduate Core Courses in arts stream:
Department of Economics
Department of Education
Department of English
Department of Geography
Department of History
Department of Mizo
Department of Political Science

References

External links
 

Universities and colleges in Mizoram
Colleges affiliated to Mizoram University